Kraśniewo  is a village in the administrative district of Gmina Malbork, within Malbork County, Pomeranian Voivodeship, in northern Poland.

Before 1772 the area was part of the Kingdom of Poland, from 1772-1919 of Prussia and Germany, from 1920-1939 of the Free City of Danzig, and from September 1939 to February 1945 of Nazi Germany. For the history of the region, see History of Pomerania.

The village has a population of 230.

References

Villages in Malbork County